Socialism in Bangladesh differs from socialist countries where all the means of production are owned socially. Socialism is one of the four fundamental principles of state policy in the original Constitution of Bangladesh, along with nationalism, democracy and secularism. It's also mentioned in the preamble. "Socialism" has been considered in the Constitution as "a way to establish an exploitation-free society". The constitution allows cooperative and private ownership along with state ownership. The Constitution recognizes Bangladesh as a people's republic, and pledges to ensure the emancipation of peasants and workers, and endeavours to protect and improve their conditions. Like socialist constitutions, it also declares for free and compulsory education.

After the independence, newly established Bangladesh, led by Sheikh Mujibur Rahman, was shaped as a socialist economy. However it resulted a chaotic situation and economic backslide. In 1975, the country's political structure was changed to a socialist state and only one vanguard party existed in the country. After the assassination of Mujib, the country saw a regime change and socialism eventually removed from the constitution in 1979 and liberalization was started. Free market economy was introduced, state enterprises were dismalted and subsidies were withdrawn. In 2011, the term "socialism" and "socialist" were reintroduced to make the constitution more in line with the original document, but the country remained a liberal mixed economy.

History

Early history 

Before the partition, region of Bengal was one of the important centers of revolutionary activities in British India. Bengali leaders played a vital role to introduce and assemble socialism as well as communism in India, such as Muzaffar Ahmad, co-founder of Communist Party of India.

After partition, communist activities were re-organized in newly established Pakistan. In 1949, Awami Muslim League, the predecessor of modern Awami League, was established aiming to establish exploitation-free society and abolishment of zamindar system. During the 1954 provincial elections in East Pakistan, Awami League-led United Front gained the exclusive mandate in East Pakistan. Earlier in 1950, Communist Party of Pakistan played a major role in labour strikes for the support of the language movement. The Communist Party, with support from the United front, formed a democratic government in East Pakistan. In 1958, the government in East Pakistan was dismissed by the central government.

Socialist era (1972–1975) 

After the liberation of Bangladesh in 1971, some socialistic approaches were taken by the Government of Bangladesh, increasing state participation in the productive activities to improve the economic status of the war ridden country. With a view to establishing a socialist nation under a Soviet economic model, many large and medium-sized enterprises and public utility enterprises were nationalized. On 26 March 1972, all banks, and all insurance companies excluding the branches of foreign banks were nationalized.

Sheikh Mujibur Rahman, the first president and the "founding father" of the country, advocated socialism and secularism in the country. According to him, the country's wealth belongs to all the people of Bangladesh. Everybody will have share in whatever would be produced. Exploitation would be stopped. The constitution was highly dominated by socialist ideas and his party Awami League became the de facto vanguard party.

However, these initiatives resulted a rise of left-wing insurgance in the country, and many anti-AL organizations broke out, like Jatiya Samajtantrik Dal (JaSaD) and Purba Banglar Sarbahara Party. A people's militia named Jatiya Rakkhi Bahini (JRB) was formed to handle the insurgance, which eventually involved with extrajudicial killings, enforced disappearances and atrocities.

The economy also saw a backslide. Reformation process left only the small and cottage industries for the private sector. Public sector expanded very rapidly, but the share of public sector in GDP and in total productive efforts was insignificant. This was because the agricultural sector was left to the private sector, which comprised about 80% of the national economy. In 1974, a great famine broke out in the country, which emerges the mismanagement and failure of the system.

On 24 February 1975, due to increasing insurgency and political and economic mismanagements, Sheikh Mujibur Rahman called for a socialist revolution in the country, named Second Revolution. Using the powers granted to him by the fourth amendment of the constitution, he formed a new political party, Bangladesh Krishak Sramik Awami League (BaKSAL). It would be the only party allowed in Parliament. Bangladesh became a one-party state. The party advocated state socialism as a part of the group of reforms under the theory of Second Revolution. BaKSAL was the decision making council to achieve the objectives of the Second Revolution. Government also restricted civil liberties and most of the newspapers were banned.

Growing insurgency, political and economic mismanagements and JRB atrocities formed an anti-Mujibist and anti socialist sentiment in the military. On 15 August 1975, Mujib along with his most of the family members was assassinated. Four of his closest allies and leading figures of the Revolution were killed on 3 November in that year. With the assassination of Sheikh Mujibur Rahman, BaKSAL was dissolved and Second Revolution failed.

Post-socialist era 
After the assassination of Mujib in 1975, new military leaders launched a de-Mujibization and liberalization programme develop a capitalist society. During the years of military rule that followed under Ziaur Rahman (1975-1981) and Hussain Muhammad Ershad (1982-1990), socialist policies and rhetoric were abandoned. Zia withdrawn most of the policies of the Second revolution and reintroduced multi-party representative system. Liberal and progressivist political parties were revivaled, as well as JaSad and other revolutionary Marxist–Leninist political parties were crushed during the post-coup purges. Relationships with United States and other Western Bloc countries also improved by that time.

Economy of Bangladesh saw a de-socialization as well as de-centralization by this time. Many state-owned enterprises were privatised, like banking, telecommunication, aviation, media, and jute. Trade liberalization and exports promoted. Economic policies aimed at encouraging private enterprise and investment, privatising public industries, reinstating budgetary discipline, and liberalising the import regime were accelerated.

Contemporary Bangladesh 
Today, contemporary Bangladesh has among the most liberalized economies of South Asia. It is characterised as a developing market economy. Awami League, the party which one time promoted socialism in the country, is currently encouraging free market economy and foreign investment. In 1991, AL president and Prime Minister of Bangladesh Sheikh Hasina noted that socialism was a failed system.

Bangladesh ranked 128th out of 178 countries in the 2017 Index of Economic Freedom.

Parties

Registereds

Bangladesh Awami League
Communist Party of Bangladesh 
Jatiya Samajtantrik Dal
Workers Party of Bangladesh
Socialist Party of Bangladesh
Krishak Sramik Janata League
Revolutionary Workers Party of Bangladesh
Bangladesh National Awami Party
Jatiya Samajtantrik Dal (Rab)
Communist Party of Bangladesh (Marxist–Leninist)

Unregistereds
Purba Banglar Sarbahara Party
Maoist Bolshevik Reorganisation Movement of the Purba Banglar Sarbahara Party

See also

Secularism in Bangladesh
Democracy in Bangladesh
Politics of Bangladesh
Mujibism

References

 
Politics of Bangladesh
Constitution of Bangladesh
Economy of Bangladesh
Fundamental principles of the constitution of Bangladesh
Bangladesh